The 1914 Dartmouth football team was an American football team that represented Dartmouth College as an independent during the 1914 college football season. In its fourth season under head coach Frank Cavanaugh, the team compiled an 8–1 record, shut out six of nine opponents, and outscored all opponents by a total of 359 to 25. Lawrence Whitney was the team captain.

Schedule

References

Dartmouth
Dartmouth Big Green football seasons
Dartmouth football